August Gustavson (19 December 1894 Kalvi Parish (now Viru-Nigula Parish), Kreis Wierland – 26 December 1941 Ussolye prison camp, Perm Oblast) was an Estonian politician. He was a member of V Riigikogu, representing the Estonian Socialist Workers' Party. He was a member of the Riigikogu since 25 May 1934. He replaced Josep Rukki. On 21 June 1934, he resigned his position and he was replaced by Johannes Kraan.

References

1894 births
1941 deaths
People from Viru-Nigula Parish
People from Kreis Wierland
Estonian Socialist Workers' Party politicians
Members of the Riigikogu, 1932–1934
Estonian people who died in Soviet detention
People who died in the Gulag